Kim Jong-hyeon (born June 8, 1995), formerly known by his stage name JR, is a South Korean singer, songwriter and actor. He is best known as the leader, main dancer and main rapper of South Korean boy group NU'EST. Following his contract expiration with Pledis Entertainment in 2022, Kim signed an exclusive contract as a soloist and actor under Evermore Entertainment , debuting with the release of his first extended play Meridiem on November 8, 2022.

Career

Pre-debut
Jonghyeon was the first male trainee at Pledis Entertainment. He was a Pledis trainee for three years before debut. His first appearance was through Orange Caramel's "Bangkok City" music video, and was first introduced toward public in the show Hello Counselor by Kahi together with Baekho. He was featured in Uee's solo song "Sok Sok Sok". Jonghyeon also served as a back up dancer for After School Blue's "Wonder Boy" music video and live performances, together with NU'EST members and Seventeen's S.Coups. In December 2011, Kim and the other Pledis trainees dubbed as After School Boys performed together with After School on SBS Gayo Daejeon.

2012–2022: NU'EST

On March 15, 2012 Kim debuted as the main rapper, main dancer and leader of the South Korean boy group NU'EST.

Kim participated in the reality television series Produce 101 Season 2 during the first half of 2017 and he ranked 14th. Following the conclusion of Produce 101 Season 2, Kim became a model for the cosmetics company Labiotte. He also joined the JTBC variety show Night Goblin as a fixed cast member and the tvN music show  as a panelist.

On June 27, 2018 Kim was confirmed as a member of Mnet's new romance reality show . He joined the celebrity-studded cast alongside four others, including Shin Dong-yup and Hong Seok-cheon.

In 2019 Kim became the brand ambassador of beauty brand Origins for South Korea. On April 13, 2020, he renewed his contract with the brand.

In April 2021 Kim was cast in the role of Lee Shin in the SBS musical drama Let Me Be Your Knight. On the same month, he became the main host of the Naver NOW audio show "Royal Comics".

It was announced on February 28, 2022, that NU'EST's exclusive contract with Pledis Entertainment will expire on March 14, 2022, and Kim (alongside members Aron and Ren) will leave the agency, therefore concluding their 10-year career as a group.

2022–present: Solo activities 

In May 2022 Kim signed a contract with Evermore Entertainment as a solo artist and actor.

In June 2022 Kim held his first fan meeting, Hi! (하이!) on July 2, 2022, at the Jamsil Student Gymnasium. After the event, Kim also held hi-touch session with approximately 3,500 audience.

In September 2022 it was announced that JR debuted with his first solo album. It was released on November 8. In October 2022, it was announced that Kim would release his first mini album "Meridiem" on November 8.On October 31, the agency announced that the album release schedule has been postponed. A new date will be announced at a later date due to the Seoul Halloween crowd crush event.

Discography

Extended plays

Singles

Other charted songs

Filmography

Film

Television series

Web series

Television shows

Radio

Awards and nominations

Notes

References

External links

1995 births
Living people
South Korean male idols
South Korean pop singers
Produce 101 contestants
People from Gangneung
21st-century South Korean  male singers
South Korean actors
South Korean male pop singers
NU'EST